The Physical Therapy is a monthly peer-reviewed medical journal covering research about physical therapy. It is the official journal of the American Physical Therapy Association and was established in 1921.  According to the Journal Citation Reports, the journal has a 2018 impact factor of 3.043.

References

External links

Physical therapy journals
Publications established in 1921
English-language journals
Monthly journals